Jash (stylized as JASH) is a comedy community and advertising agency created by Michael Cera, Tim Heidecker, Eric Wareheim, Sarah Silverman and Reggie Watts. New videos are posted to the Jash homepage periodically by the creative team, and by new members of the always expanding collective of comics. Jash premiered online March 10, 2013. Since its launch, Jash has gone on to extend its reach into traditional media with television series and award-winning short films.

"JASH" itself is an acronym that stands for "Just Attitude So Hey".

History

Formation
Jash was formed under the YouTube Original Channel Initiative in October 2012.

Launch
The channel was launched on March 10, 2013, concurrent with a kickoff panel by the creative team during South by Southwest (SXSW), broadcast live on the podcast Comedy Bang! Bang!

Acquisition by Group Nine Media
On November 7, 2017, JASH was acquired by Group Nine Media, which Discovery Communications (later Discovery Inc.) holds a 35% stake in.

References

External links 

 
 

2013 establishments in the United States
YouTube channels launched in 2013
Tim & Eric
Sarah Silverman
Vox Media